Northern Ireland Electricity Networks Limited (NIE Networks) is the electricity asset owner of the transmission and distribution infrastructure in Northern Ireland, established in 1993 when the business was privatised. NIE Networks does not generate or supply electricity. Since 2010 it has been a subsidiary of ESB Group.

NIE Networks has three transmission interconnectors with the transmission grid in the Republic of Ireland. The main interconnector was built in 1970 between Tandragee and Louth but The Troubles saw the interconnector destroyed in 1975 and left in that state for twenty years until repair.

NIE Networks should not be confused with Power NI, its own former supply business, which was not part of the sale to the ESB and remains owned by Viridian. NIE Energy changed its name to Power NI on 25 July 2011, as ESB retained the NIE name in Northern Ireland.

History

Background 
Electricity supplies in Northern Ireland started in the early 1890s with the establishment of electricity undertakings by the Belfast and Londonderry City Corporations. The co-ordination of supplies took place in 1931 with the foundation of the Electricity Board for Northern Ireland. The ownership of the all public power stations in Northern Ireland was vested in the Electricity Board in 1949.

Belfast Corporation 
Belfast Corporation Electricity Department gained the authority to generate and sell electricity under the provisions of the Belfast Electric Lighting Order 1890, confirmed by the Electric Lighting Orders Confirmation (No.7) Act 1890. The corporation's area of supply was 83 square miles with a population of 502,000 (1958). By 1958 there were three electricity generating stations at Belfast East, Belfast West and East Bridge.

Belfast East power station (formerly Harbour power station) comprised eight turbo-alternator generating sets: 1 × 6 MW British Thomson-Houston, 2 × 15 MW, 1 × 18.75 MW and 4 × 30 MW Metropolitan Vickers, a total electricity capacity of 174.75 MW. These were supplied with up to 2,010,000 pounds per hour (253 kg/s) of steam from 18 Babcock and Stirling coal-fired boilers.

Belfast West power station (formerly Victoria power station) comprised five turbo-alternator generating sets: 2 × 30 MW Parsons low pressure sets and 3 × 60 MW Parsons high pressure sets, giving a total capacity of 240 MW. The low pressure sets were supplied with up to a total of 540,000 pounds per hour (68 kg/s) of steam at 650 psi and 925 °F (44.8 bar and 496 °C) from four Clarke Chapman tri-drum coal-fired boilers. The high pressure sets were supplied with steam at 900 psi and 925 °F (62 bar and 496 °C) from three Babcock & Wilcox radiant open pass type coal-fired boilers (each 220,000 lb/hr, 27.7 kg/s) and from six Mitchell two-drum coal-fired boilers (also each 220,000 lb/hr).

The East Bridge power station comprised two 6 MW turbo-alternators supplied with up to 120,000 lb/hr (15.1 kg/s) of steam from two Stirling coal-fired boilers.

From 1958 all the electricity generated was sold in bulk to the Northern Ireland Joint Electricity Committee (NIJEC), supplies for distribution by Belfast Corporation were purchased from the NIJEC. In the year ending 31 March 1958 the Corporation exported 702,993 GWh to the NIJEC and purchased 541.750 GWh.

Consumers were supplied with a range of electric current: 220–380, 230–400 and 450–500 Volt AC and 220 and 440 Volt DC, and 550 V DC for traction. The growth in electricity supply is demonstrated in the table.

Londonderry Corporation 
Londonderry Corporation Electricity Department gained the authority to generate and sell electricity under the provisions of the Londonderry Electric Lighting Order 1891 confirmed by the Electric Lighting Orders Confirmation (No.3) Act 1891. Further powers were given by the Londonderry Corporation Act 1918. Electricity supplies commenced in May 1894. The corporation's supply area was 3.6 square miles with a population (in 1958) of 502,000. In 1958 the generating station comprised: two 1,000 kW Westinghouse, one 4,000 kW and two 6,000 kW Metropolitan Vickers turbo-alternators. There were also six rotary converters for the DC supply. The turbo-alternators were supplied with steam from two Babcock & Wilcox and four Yarrow coal-fired boilers. Consumer supplies were 220–440 Volts DC and 220–380 Volts AC. The electricity supply from the mid-1950s is shown in the table.

Electricity Board for Northern Ireland 
The Electricity Board for Northern Ireland was established in 1931 under the provisions of the Electricity (Supply) Act (Northern Ireland) 1931. Its duty was to co-ordinate and improve the supply, distribution and sale of electricity. The board's area of supply was 5,200 square miles, with a population of 825,000 and 208,000 premises. Several electricity development schemes were scheduled in the 1931 Act. For example, the first scheme included most of County Down and County Armagh and part of County Tyrone. The schemes culminated in an eighth scheme authorised in June 1947 to cover all remaining parts of Northern Ireland.

Under the Electricity (Supply) Act (Northern Ireland) 1948 the Ministry of Commerce transferred to the Board all the electricity property and assets held by the Ministry including the power stations at Ballylumford and Larne. In 1957 the generating capacity of Ballylumford power station was 124.5 MW. There were 160,025 consumers, and 510.961 GWh of electricity were sold.

The station at Curran Point Larne was used for winter peak loads and maintenance outages. In 1957 it generated 48.9 MWh. The Board also owned a hydro-electric station at Limavady.

The Electricity (Supply) Act (Northern Ireland) 1948 also established the Northern Ireland Joint Electricity Committee (NIJEC). The committee had a duty to co-ordinate, control and improve the generation of electricity and primary transmission throughout Northern Ireland, to make adequate supplies available to electricity undertakings, and to encourage rural electrification. The Board and other undertakings were required to sell to the NIJEC the electricity generated at Ballylumford, Larne, Belfast and Londonderry power stations which the NIJEC bought at cost of production. The NIJEC resold electricity at a standard tariff to the distributing authorities.

In 1973 the Northern Ireland Electricity Service (NIES) was formed as a public utility to generate, transmit and supply electricity to Northern Ireland.

During the Ulster Workers' Council strike in 1974, when electricity supplies were severely disrupted, the government considered generating power using a Royal Navy nuclear submarine in Belfast Lough but the idea was abandoned as being technically unfeasible.

Establishment and divestments 
In 1991, the company was incorporated as a government-owned public limited company, Northern Ireland Electricity plc. In 1992 the power stations at Belfast Harbour, Ballylumford, Coolkeeragh and Carrickfergus (Kilroot) were demerged and sold. In 1993 the remainder of NIE (transmission, supply and retail businesses) was privatised as Northern Ireland Electricity plc. In 1998, Northern Ireland Electricity plc became part of Viridian Group plc, with Northern Ireland Electricity a subsidiary of that holding company.

NIE Networks sold SONI, the operator of the transmission network, to EirGrid in March 2009 for £30 million.

Purchase by ESB 
On 7 July 2010 BBC News reported that ESB was to purchase NIE for £1 billion. In September 2010 unionist politicians Peter Robinson and Reg Empey wrote to the Taoiseach objecting to the transaction. They said it was "inappropriate" and that it amounted to the purchase of a "key component" of Northern Ireland's infrastructure. ESB is a statutory corporation in the Republic of Ireland whose board members are appointed by the Irish government. The acquisition was completed in December 2010 at a reported cost of £1.2bn.

NIE Networks remains an autonomous organisation with its own board and management teams, and separate regulation via the Utility Regulator.

Operations 
The company's transmission and distribution network consists of 45,000 kilometers of overhead lines and underground cables, 75,000 pole-mounted transformers and 258 major substations. As of 2018, NIE Networks transports power to over 840,000 business and domestic customers.

Network monitoring and control 
NIE Networks operates the distribution network from a primary control centre based at Carn Industrial Estate, Craigavon, County Armagh. A secondary control centre in Ballymena, County Antrim, provides a disaster recovery facility. The primary control centre is staffed 24 hours a day, and adjoins the Customer Contact Centre and Dispatch room. The control centre staff can monitor the status of circuit breakers and other assets in both the 11 kV and 33 kV networks using SCADA.

A detailed computer model is supplemented by a large wall-mounted mimic board which features LED indicators showing the status of key assets, and paper diagrams.

Incident management 
NIE Networks has developed a set of procedures for dealing with major incidents, such as storms and snow, driven by the Boxing Day Storm of 1998, during which 162,000 customers were off-supply. At the company's office in Craigavon, a small incident management room sits in a constant state of readiness. Each week, the Duty Incident Manager meets with the other designated incident team members, in charge of resources, customer contact and network status, to perform a risk assessment of the week ahead.

The risk assessment takes into account the weather forecast, provided by the Met Office, notable events happening throughout Northern Ireland, such as concerts or VIP visits, and any planned maintenance on the network, or services required for the normal operation of the system such as IT and telecoms. The team assess the risks and decide if any action should be taken to mitigate them. If any risk factor is deemed too high, such as a strong chance of high winds over 45kts, a pre-planned escalation can be scheduled for the day in question. At any time, if there are many concurrent faults, the control room staff can escalate to an Incident Level. During an incident escalation, the Duty Incident Manager and their team man the incident room continuously and co-ordinate operations between dispatch of linesmen and other field staff, communications with customers and the media, and resourcing.

5% of NIE Networks' staff are paid a retainer to be available on-call. Every member of staff has a secondary role, right up to the Managing Director. During a major incident, staff may be called upon to fulfil their secondary role, which may involve answering calls from customers in the Contact Centre or helping to co-ordinate operations.

Customer communication 
One of the major criticisms levelled at NIE during the Boxing Day Storm was the inability of customers to obtain up-to-date and accurate information on the expected resolution time of faults, and in many cases customers simply could not contact the company at all. To prevent this from happening again, NIE have retained Eckoh plc to provide the High Availability Call Answering system (HVCA) from Twenty First Century Communications. This system automatically directs callers to an automated IVR system when all of the company's call handlers are unavailable. This system captures information from the caller to identify their premises, and automatically links them to a known fault if possible. Once tagged to a fault, the customer is provided up-to-date status information by the automated system.

HVCA operates at the telecoms network level, and means that thousands of simultaneous calls can be handled, ensuring that customers never hear an engaged tone.

Normally staffed by 6 people during the day (overnight, calls are taken by the Dispatchers), the Contact Centre has the capacity to be expanded up to 70 call handlers during a major incident.

See also

List of Irish companies
Energy policy of the United Kingdom
Energy use and conservation in the United Kingdom
Green electricity in the United Kingdom
Electricity sector in Ireland
List of power stations in Northern Ireland

References

External links
 

Electric power companies of Northern Ireland
Electric power distribution network operators in the United Kingdom
British companies established in 1991